Galactic astronomy is the study of the Milky Way galaxy and all its contents. This is in contrast to extragalactic astronomy, which is the study of everything outside our galaxy, including all other galaxies.

Galactic astronomy should not be confused with galaxy formation and evolution, which is the general study of galaxies, their formation, structure, components, dynamics, interactions, and the range of forms they take.

The Milky Way galaxy, where the Solar System is located, is in many ways the best-studied galaxy, although important parts of it are obscured from view in visible wavelengths by regions of cosmic dust. The development of radio astronomy, infrared astronomy and submillimetre astronomy in the 20th century allowed the gas and dust of the Milky Way to be mapped for the first time.

Subcategories 
A standard set of subcategories is used by astronomical journals to split up the subject of Galactic Astronomy:
 abundances – the study of the location of elements heavier than helium
 bulge – the study of the bulge around the center of the Milky Way
 center – the study of the central region of the Milky Way
 disk – the study of the Milky Way disk (the plane upon which most galactic objects are aligned)
 evolution – the evolution of the Milky Way
 formation – the formation of the Milky Way
 fundamental parameters – the fundamental parameters of the Milky Way (mass, size etc.)
 globular cluster – globular clusters within the Milky Way
 halo – the large halo around the Milky Way
 kinematics, and dynamics – the motions of stars and clusters
 nucleus – the region around the black hole at the center of the Milky Way (Sagittarius A*)
 open clusters and associations – open clusters and associations of stars
 Solar neighborhood – nearby stars
 stellar content – numbers and types of stars in the Milky Way
 structure – the structure (spiral arms etc.)

Stellar populations 
 Star clusters
Globular clusters
Open clusters

Interstellar medium 
 Interplanetary space - Interplanetary medium - interplanetary dust
 Interstellar space - Interstellar medium - interstellar dust
 Intergalactic space - Intergalactic medium - Intergalactic dust

See also 
 Galaxy
 Milky Way
 Extragalactic astronomy

References

External links

Mapping the hydrogen gas in the Milky Way
Mapping the dust in the centre of the Milky Way

 
Astronomical sub-disciplines